Hill Crest Community Center is a historic community centre complex located at Clinton, Vermillion County, Indiana. The complex was built between 1911 and 1922 and consists of three interconnected buildings. The chapel was designed by architect Isaac Pursell and built in 1911.  It is a -story, brick building with Queen Anne style design elements.  The gymnasium / auditorium building was added in 1922, and is a barrel-vaulted roofed brick building with Late Colonial Revival style design elements.  The two-story, brick Prairie School style residence was also added about 1922.  The community center provided a focus of community service to the immigrant population of Clinton.

It was added to the National Register of Historic Places in 1997.

References

Event venues on the National Register of Historic Places in Indiana
Queen Anne architecture in Indiana
Colonial Revival architecture in Indiana
Buildings and structures completed in 1922
Buildings and structures in Vermillion County, Indiana
National Register of Historic Places in Vermillion County, Indiana